Olav Hummelvold (5 November 1903 – 12 August 1999) was a Norwegian politician for the Centre Party.

He served as a deputy representative to the Parliament of Norway from Hedmark during the term 1958–1961. In total he met during 19 days of parliamentary session.

References

1903 births
1999 deaths
People from Os, Innlandet
Deputy members of the Storting
Centre Party (Norway) politicians
Hedmark politicians